William Edward Hearn (21 April 1826 – 23 April 1888) was an Irish university professor and politician. He was one of the four original professors at the University of Melbourne and became the first dean of the university's law school.

Life
Hearn was born in Belturbet, County Cavan, Ireland, the son of Reverend William Edward Hearn (a curate and later a vicar) and Henrietta Hearn (née Reynolds). He was the second of seven sons in the family. Hearn was educated at Portora Royal School in Enniskillen, Ireland and later studied at Trinity College Dublin from 1842. There he was highly successful in his study of classics, logic and ethics, graduating with a Bachelor of Arts degree in 1847. Following his studies in arts, Hearn also studied law, at Trinity College and later at King's Inns in Dublin and Lincoln's Inn in London, and was admitted to the Irish Bar in 1853. 

Hearn's teaching career began in 1849, when he was selected as a professor of Ancient Greek at the Queen's College, Galway, which had been established a few years earlier. 

In 1854, a London-based committee of the newly established University of Melbourne selected Hearn as one of four original professors of the university. Hearn was to teach subjects including modern history, modern literature and political science in the Faculty of Arts, although at times during his career he also taught classics. Hearn moved to Melbourne, Australia in 1855, where he took up residence in the rooms provided on the university campus. Hearn's students at Melbourne included Alfred Deakin, H. B. Higgins, Isaac Isaacs, Alexander Sutherland, Samuel Alexander and Thomas Webb.

In January 1859, Hearn stood as a candidate for the Parliament of Victoria, in a by-election for a seat in the Victorian Legislative Assembly, he was embarrassingly unsuccessful. The university's Chancellor, Redmond Barry, was not pleased with Hearn's attempts to enter parliament, and as a result the university council passed a rule prohibiting professors from standing for election, and even from joining any political group, a rule that would last more than a century.

Hearn was admitted to the Victorian Bar in 1860, although he only occasionally practised as a barrister. In 1873, Hearn was appointed as the first Dean of the newly created Faculty of Law, lecturing in subjects such as constitutional law. In 1874 and 1877 he again stood unsuccessfully for parliament, evading the ban on professors running for election on the basis that as a dean, he had lost his professorial title. In 1878 he was finally elected to the Victorian Legislative Council, for Central Province. Hearn was regarded as a good politician, who held conservative views but was less concerned with party politics than he was with the technical business of making legislation, and by 1882 he was regarded as a leader in the council.

In May 1886, Hearn was elected as Chancellor of the University of Melbourne, however he lost his position on the university's council at the elections in October that year when his term expired and he was not re-elected, and as such he was only able to serve one year as Chancellor. Also in 1886 he was made a Queen's Counsel, in recognition of his academic work, since he rarely practised law.

Works

Hearn published several books. Plutology, or the Theory of the Efforts to Satisfy Human Wants, a political economy textbook which was well regarded by economists such as William Stanley Jevons and Francis Ysidro Edgeworth, although there is some indication that Hearn's book was derived from that of several less well known English writers. The Government of England, a work on British constitutional law, was praised by Dicey as teaching him more about the way in which early constitutional principles were developed than any other work.

Hearn's last major project was an attempt to codify Victorian law, which resulted in a book published on its theoretical basis, The Theory of Legal Duties and Rights, and a draft bill which ultimately entered parliament for consideration. The codification, influenced by positivist and utilitarian thought, was "based on a Benthamite-Austinian view of jurisprudence".

However, the codification was never adopted since "although praised in Parliament, [it] was regarded as too abstract by practising lawyers." Thus although it "provoked formal admiration... it was quietly abandoned in favour of simple consolidation." Although the codification was not adopted, Hearn nevertheless helped through his other work to establish a strong and dominant tradition of positivism in Australia.

Family and death
In 1847, Hearn married his first wife, Rose Le Fanu, the daughter of a rector. The two had six children: five daughters and one son. In 1877, Rose Hearn died. In 1878, William Hearn married a second time, to Isabel St Clair, in Melbourne. This union was childless.

William Hearn died in Melbourne in April 1888, aged 62. He was survived by his son and three of his daughters.

He had built up and extensive library of books that were sold at auction in August 1888.

References

External links
 

1826 births
1888 deaths
Alumni of Trinity College Dublin
Irish Anglicans
Irish barristers
Members of Lincoln's Inn
Australian legal scholars
Australian King's Counsel
People educated at Portora Royal School
Members of the Victorian Legislative Council
People from County Cavan
19th-century Australian politicians
Irish emigrants to colonial Australia
Academics of the University of Galway
Alumni of King's Inns
Australian book and manuscript collectors
Academic staff of the University of Melbourne